The 1953 European Rowing Championships were rowing championships held on Lake Bagsværd near the Danish capital Copenhagen. Men competed in all seven Olympic boat classes (M1x, M2x, M2-, M2+, M4-, M4+, M8+). The regatta was also the third test event for international women's rowing organised by the International Rowing Federation (FISA), with nine countries competing in four boat classes (W1x, W2x, W4+, W8+) over the shorter race distance of 1,000 m (men competed over 2,000 m). The purpose of the test event was to see whether women's rowing should formally become part of the FISA-organised European Rowing Championships.

Women's test event
The women’s test event was the third regatta organised to check whether international women's rowing was viable. Four countries had competed at the previous test events (Mâcon in 1951 and Amsterdam in 1952): France, Great Britain, the Netherlands, and Denmark. In 1953, the four initial countries were joined by Norway, Finland, Austria, West Germany and Poland. The same four boat classes (W1x, W2x, W4+, W8+) as in the two previous years were contested.

There were only three boats entered for the eight event and a single race decided the medals: the Netherlands won gold, silver went to Great Britain, and the Danish crew was awarded bronze.

As part of the 1953 European Championships, FISA held a congress in Copenhagen. It was decided for women's rowing to become an official part of the European Championships, with the first full event to be held as part of the 1954 European Rowing Championships in Amsterdam. In addition, a fifth boat class was added to the regatta from 1954: coxed quad scull.

Medal summary – men's events

References

European Rowing Championships
European Rowing Championships
International sports competitions in Copenhagen
Rowing
Rowing